Ashtamangalam Siva Temple  is located in the city of Thrissur at Ashtamangalam in Thrissur district. The presiding deity of the temple is Shiva, located in separate sanctum sanatoriums, facing east. It is believed that this temple is one of the 108 Shiva temples of Kerala and is installed by sage Parasurama dedicated to Shiva. The temple is located near Karyattukara on the Laloor road. Shivarathri festival of the temple celebrates in the Malayalam month of Kumbha (February - March).

See also
 108 Shiva Temples
 Temples of Kerala

References

108 Shiva Temples
Shiva temples in Kerala
Hindu temples in Thrissur district